Romarinho may refer to the following footballers:

 Romarinho (footballer, born 1985), Brazilian midfielder, playing for Kalmar FF
 Romarinho (footballer, born 1990), Brazilian midfielder/forward, playing for Al-Ittihad
 Romarinho (footballer, born 1993), Brazilian forward, playing for CR Vasco da Gama, son of former Brazilian footballer Romário
 Romarinho (footballer, born 1994), Brazilian forward, playing for Fortaleza